Ring toss is a game where rings are tossed around a peg. It is common at amusement parks. A variant, sometimes referred to as "ring-a-bottle", replaces pegs with bottles, where the thrower may keep the bottle (and its contents) if successful.

Ring toss is also a game for toddlers and children that can assist in the development of motor skills and hand-eye coordination development.

See also
 Horseshoes
 Quoits
 Muckers
 
 Ring Toss

References

Further reading
 Handbook of Evidence-Based Treatment Manuals for Children and Adolescents
 Great Games for Young Children
 Game Play: Therapeutic Use of Childhood Games
 Tag, Toss & Run: 40 Classic Lawn Games
 Small Business and Entrepreneurship

Carnival games
Throwing games